Sir Henry Unton (or Umpton) (c. 155723 March 1596) was an Elizabethan English diplomat.

Life
Unton was born at Wychwood and was the second son of Sir Edward Unton (d. 1583) of Wadley House, near Faringdon, Berkshire (now Oxfordshire). His mother Lady Anne Seymour (d. 1588) was a daughter of the Duke of Somerset, the Lord Protector under Edward VI. His elder brother was Edward Unton, who died in 1589.

Educated at Oriel College, Oxford, Unton became the member of parliament for New Woodstock in 1584. He served with the English forces in the Netherlands in 1585 and 1586, being present at the skirmish of Zutphen. In 1586 he was knighted by Robert Dudley, Earl of Leicester.

In 1591, through the good offices of the earl of Essex, Unton was sent as ambassador to Henry IV of France; he became very friendly with this king and accompanied him on a campaign in Normandy before he was recalled to England in June 1592.

Again securing a seat in 1593 in parliament as a knight of the shire for Berkshire, he lost for a short time the favour of Queen Elizabeth, but was sent that same year as ambassador to France. He died in the French camp at La Fère on 23 March 1596, a collection of Latin verses being published in his memory at Oxford later in the year. This was edited by his chaplain, Robert Wright (1560–1643), afterwards bishop of Lichfield and Coventry.

After his death, his body was returned to England and buried at All Saints' Church in Faringdon.

Shortly afterwards his widow, Dame Dorothy Unton (née Wroughton), commissioned an unknown artist to paint a very unusual portrait of Unton. In addition to showing the sitter as he appeared shortly before his death, the painting also uses a narrative style to show ten other important events in his life. The series begins with his birth and ends with his impressive funeral procession. The painting now resides at the National Portrait Gallery in London. She was later remarried to Sir George Shirley, 1st Baronet, and was known as Dame Dorothy Shirley.

References

External links
Royal Berkshire History: Sir Henry Unton
Tudor Place: Sir Henry Unton (Ambassador in France)
Sir Henry Unton: A resource to supplement the MAPE Focus on History pack

1550s births
1596 deaths
Alumni of Oriel College, Oxford
Ambassadors of England to France
16th-century English diplomats
People from Faringdon
English MPs 1584–1585
English MPs 1593
English knights
Members of the Parliament of England for Berkshire